Lehenda-ShVSM Chernihiv is a former Ukrainian professional women's football club from Chernihiv, Ukraine. In 2018, it merged with Yednist Plysky as Yednist-ShVSM Plysky.

ShVSM abbreviation stands for School of Higher Sports Mastery.

History

Origin during the Soviet Time 
Initially the team was named as SK Polissia Chernihiv. In October 1987, Mychailo Yushchenko decides to establish a women's football team at the "Polissia" gymnasium, which gave its name to SK Polissia team. The creation of the team supported the local Cheksil "Worsted and Cloth Factory Combine". Thats why the team used also the name Lehenda-Cheksil.  The club was formed by the factory workers, as well as pupils from city's schools № 11 and 14, vocational school № 13 and students from the Chernihiv Pedagogical Institute (Chernihiv Pedagogical University). In the beginning of April 1988, the team played its first match, in which it tied 2:2 with students of the Moscow Pedagogical Institute.

From SK Polissya Chernihiv to Lehenda Chernihiv 
 In the first days of June 1988, the club was renamed into Lehenda Chernihiv, taking part in amateur championships.
The first significant success of the "Lehenda" was the 3rd place of the Ukrainian Trade Unions sports association championship in November 1989. At the same time, the female football players made their debut in the USSR championship among Trade Union sports associations and placed 16th among 30 teams. In 1990 and 1991 there was conducted the official Soviet women's football championship where Lehenda competed at the Higher League (top tier). In 1990 they placed 7th in their group and in 1991 6th.

After the collapse of the Soviet Union in 1992, there took place the first league championship of Ukraine, the Ukrainian Women's League. The Lehenda football players won their first medals, the bronze medals. In 1997 the Lehenda's tenth anniversary was marked with its first "silver" of the national competitions. On the basis of the Chernihiv team, there was established the Ukraine youth team. In 1998-1999, "Lehenda" was finishing second yielding the championship title to "Donchanka" Donetsk.

Champion of Ukrainian Women's League and Women's Cup 
In 2000 they have won their first Ukrainian Women's League title and in 2001 playing under the name Lehenda-Cheksil Chernihiv they won the Women's Cup. In 2002 they won the double, the Ukrainian Women's League and the Women's Cup and also in 2005 and 2009 they won the double in 2007 they won the Italy Women's Cup. At European level they came second in the group again, this time behind the Swedish club Malmö FF. The association founded a youth academy for girls between the ages of nine and 15 in order to encourage young talent.
In 2009 the won again both the Ukrainian Women's League and the Women's Cup and in 2010 they won the Ukrainian Women's League. The offensive rock "Legend" has a different kind of "golden take".
The team participate also in UEFA Women's Champions League in the season 2011–12.

Recent time 
In May 2020 Lehenda won defeated Yatran-Basis Uman W in a difficult match, in the 2nd round of the Ukrainian Football Championship among women's teams at the Stadium Tekstylnyk. In the season 2017-18 the team arrived 3 in the Ukrainian Women's League behind Zhytlobud-1 Kharkiv and Zhytlobud-2 Kharkiv. After this season the team withdrew. In 2018 due to poor financing Lehenda-ShVSM Chernihiv was merged with the recently formed Yednist Plysky women's club, therefore Ivan Bubys who previously was coaching Desna Chernihiv invited Kulyk to coach at the Skala Stryi youth academy as its under-15 boys team coach.

Stadium and facilities
The matches are initially played at the Tekstylschyk stadium in Lokomotiv stadium and in Khimik Sport Complex. Afterward the team played also in the new modern Chernihiv Arena in Chernihiv, belong to FC Chernihiv.

Notable players

Former players
  Daryna Apanaschenko
  Vera Dyatel
  Alla Lyshafay
  Lyudmyla Pekur
  Svetlana Petko
  Iryna Zvarych
  Oksana Yakovyshyn
  Tetyana Fedosova
  Tetyana Chorna
  Nadiya Baranova
  Anastasia Ilyina
  Masha Vintonyak
  Lyudmyla Lemeshko
  Yulia Vashchenko

Managers

Honours
Ukrainian Women's League
 Winners (6):  2000, 2001, 2002, 2005, 2009, 2010
 Runners-up (10): 1997, 1998, 1999, 2003, 2004, 2006, 2008, 2011, 2013, 2015
 Third place (6):: 1992, 2007, 2014, 2016, 2017–18

Women's Cup
 Winners (4):  2001, 2002, 2005, 2009
 Runners-up (14): 1998, 1999, 2003, 2004, 2006, 2007, 2008, 2010, 2011, 2013, 2014, 2015, 2016, 2017–18

Winter Championship
 Winners (1):  2013
 Runners-up (2): 2008, 2018

Italy Women's Cup:
 Winners (1):  2006
 Third place (1):: 2005

European history

Performance statistics

CCCP (1990–1991) 
Виступи в Soviet championship:

See also
 List of Chernihiv Sport Teams
 FC Desna Chernihiv
 FC Desna-2 Chernihiv
 FC Desna-3 Chernihiv
 SDYuShOR Desna
 FC Chernihiv
 Yunist Chernihiv
 FC Yednist' Plysky
 Spartak Chernihiv

References

External links
  Club webpage at the Chernihiv Regional Football Federation website.
 Legenda-ShVSM Chernigiv from Uefa.com
  Легенда-ШВСМ (Чернигов)
 Lehenda Chernihiv: from a worsted cloth production association to the legend ("Легенда" (Чернігів): від камвольно-суконного комбінату — до легенди ). Footboom. 11 December 2013.

 
Football clubs in Chernihiv
Football clubs in Chernihiv Oblast
Association football clubs established in 1987
Association football clubs disestablished in 2018
1987 establishments in Ukraine
2018 disestablishments in Ukraine
Ukrainian Women's League clubs
Defunct women's football clubs in Ukraine